David Tronzo (born 1957) is an American guitarist, best known for his innovation of pairing the techniques of electric slide guitar with the genres of bebop, modern jazz, rock, downtown music, and experimental music. He has recorded with former David Bowie guitarist Reeves Gabrels, Wayne Horvitz, David Sanborn, and The Lounge Lizards.

Biography
David Tronzo was born in 1957 in Rochester, New York. He was drawn to music at age eleven and decided on guitar by age thirteen and taught himself. By age fifteen he was playing gigs. "I was playing five nights a week, though I really just had three good notes and five good chords." He credits rock music as an early influence.

He lived in New York City from 1979 to 2002. As Visiting Artist at Berlin's Hochschule der Künste (HdK), his technique on the slide guitar was documented in two doctoral theses in Germany, in 1995 and 2001. He has also been an Artist in Residence at the Haystack Mountain School of Crafts in Maine.

He appeared in the movie Talking Guitars as himself in 2007. His work has also appeared on the soundtracks of two films: Short Cuts in 1993 and Excess Baggage in 1997.

Tronzo has been an associate professor at the Berklee College of Music since 2003.

Awards and honors 
 1993 Voted one of the Top 100 Guitarists of the 20th Century in Musician magazine Press Poll
 1994 Voted one of the Top Ten Jazz Guitarists by Musician magazine
 1995 Voted second in its 1995 poll for Best Experimental Guitarist by Guitar Player magazine

Discography

As leader
 Roots (Knitting Factory, 1994)
 Night in Amnesia with Reeves Gabrels (Upstart, 1995)
 Yo! Hey! (Radio Bremen, 1996)
 Crunch (Love Slave, 1999)

As member
 At Home, Slow Poke (1998)
 Redemption, Slow Poke (2000)
 Queen of All Ears, Lounge Lizards (1998)
 V16, V16 (2003)
 Gravity All Nonsense Now, Club D'Elf (2005)
 100 Years of Flight, Club D'Elf (2005)
 Now I Understand, Club D'Elf (2006)
 The Sonic Temple Monday and Tuesday, V16 (2007)
 VANCOUVER '08, V16 (2008)
 Electric Moroccoland/So Below, Club D'Elf (2011)

As sideman
 1991 Another Hand, David Sanborn
 1991 Life's Too Short, Marshall Crenshaw
 1992 Live at the Knitting Factory, John Zorn
 1992 Phillip Johnston's Big Trouble, Phillip Johnston
 1994 Last Day on Earth, John Cale/Bob Neuwirth
 1995 Time Was, Curtis Stigers
 1995 Travel On, Julian Dawson
 1996 Walking on Locusts, John Cale
 1999 An American Diary Vol. 2, Mike Mainieri
 1999 Candy and Dirt, Heather Eatman
 1999 Tender Trap, Janis Siegel
 2000 Written in Red, Louise Taylor
 2001 Real, Heather Eatman
 2003 Dime Grind Palace, Sex Mob
 2003 You Inspire Me, Curtis Stigers

References

 
 

Living people
1957 births
Musicians from Rochester, New York
Berklee College of Music faculty
American jazz guitarists
20th-century American guitarists
Jazz musicians from New York (state)
The Lounge Lizards members
Spanish Fly (band) members